Robert Law McCartney, KC (born 24 April 1936) is a  Northern Irish barrister and Unionist politician who was the founder and leader of the UK Unionist Party (UKUP) from 1995 to 2008.

He was initially a member of the Ulster Unionist Party (UUP) but was expelled in June 1987 when he refused to withdraw from the general election of that year. He stood against the incumbent Popular Unionist Party MP Sir James Kilfedder in North Down as a "Real Unionist" but failed to win the seat.

In the 1995 by-election in North Down after the death of Kilfedder he was elected as a "UK Unionist" defeating the Ulster Unionist Party candidate. He subsequently established the United Kingdom Unionist Party to contest elections to the Northern Ireland Forum and the related talks which started
in 1996. The other party representatives to the Forum were Dr Conor Cruise O'Brien and Cedric Wilson, a former low-level DUP member in the 1980s. McCartney retained his Westminster seat in the 1997 election.

He opposed the subsequent Belfast Agreement in the May 1998 referendum and his party won five seats in the Assembly elections later that year (McCartney himself in North Down, Cedric Wilson in Strangford, Patrick Roche in Lagan Valley, Norman Boyd in South Antrim and Roger Hutchinson in East Antrim).

However, Wilson, Roche, Boyd and Hutchinson parted company with McCartney in December 1998 because of their leader's so-called 'exit strategy' from the Northern Ireland Assembly in the event of Sinn Féin being allowed seats in the new Northern Ireland Government. McCartney denounced them, saying all four were "famous in their own living rooms" and that their supporters could "fit into a telephone box". In 2008 both Wilson and Boyd attended meetings of Jim Allister's Traditional Unionist Voice.

In 1999, McCartney ran for the party in elections to the European Parliament, winning 2.9% of the first preference vote. He lost his Westminster seat in the 2001 election to the UUP candidate Lady Sylvia Hermon.

He was committed to a policy of integration for Northern Ireland, whereby legislative devolution for Northern Ireland would no longer be Westminster's abiding policy, there would be no Stormont legislative assembly and the province would be a fully participating part of the United Kingdom; at the same time, the three main British political parties would fully organise in Northern Ireland. He was the president of the Campaign for Equal Citizenship in 1986, and led it in its four years of prominence after the 1985 Anglo-Irish Agreement.
 McCartney resigned as head of the Campaign for Equal Citizenship in 1988 over a dispute with its executive.

These integrationist policies, once popular in some sections of Unionism, receded with the introduction of devolution to Scotland and Wales, and the creation of a functioning Northern Ireland Assembly. However it is the case that other parts of the United Kingdom with devolved assemblies are fully covered by the three main British political parties, but not Northern Ireland.

McCartney also strongly opposed the St Andrews Agreement and in 2007 stood on an anti-agreement ticket in six constituencies. He lost his own seat in North Down, polling 1,806 first preference votes (5.9% of the total, and less than half the quota required to be elected). He also obtained 360 votes (1.2%) in Belfast North, 388 votes (0.8%) in Fermanagh and South Tyrone, 853 votes (2.0%) in Lagan Valley, 893 votes (2.3%) in South Antrim and 220 votes (0.5%) in West Tyrone.

He claims to have retired from politics following the loss of his seat in the 2007 Assembly Election to Brian Wilson of the Green Party. However, he still occasionally makes media appearances and writes newspaper articles. In October 2009, McCartney was guest speaker at the Traditional Unionist Voice party conference in Belfast, where he spoke on the situation surrounding the primary school transfer test, brought about by a Sinn Féin Education Minister.

Notes

External links 
 
Maiden Speech : House of Commons – 5 July 1995

1936 births
Living people
Leaders of political parties in Northern Ireland
Members of the Parliament of the United Kingdom for County Down constituencies (since 1922)
UK MPs 1992–1997
UK MPs 1997–2001
UK Unionist Party MLAs
Ulster Unionist Party members of the House of Commons of the United Kingdom
Northern Ireland MPAs 1982–1986
Members of the Northern Ireland Forum
Northern Ireland MLAs 1998–2003
Northern Ireland MLAs 2003–2007
People educated at Grosvenor Grammar School
Northern Ireland King's Counsel